Chandarlapadu is a village in NTR district of the Indian state of Andhra Pradesh. It is located in Chandarlapadu mandal of Nandigama revenue division. It is one of the villages in the mandal to be a part of Andhra Pradesh Capital Region.

See also 
Villages in Chandarlapadu mandal

References 

Villages in Krishna district
Mandal headquarters in Krishna district